Aïnoumal  is a small town in southern-central Senegal. It is located in the Kaolack Region.

References

External links
Satellite map at Maplandia.com

Populated places in Kaolack Region